Flight is a public art work by artist Arlie Sinaiko located at the Lynden Sculpture Garden near Milwaukee, Wisconsin. The sculpture is an abstract form made bronze; it is V-shaped and installed on the lawn.

References

Outdoor sculptures in Milwaukee
1966 sculptures
Bronze sculptures in Wisconsin
Abstract sculptures in Wisconsin
1966 establishments in Wisconsin